The Turboliners were a family of gas turbine trainsets built for Amtrak in the 1970s. They were among the first new equipment purchased by Amtrak to update its fleet with faster, more modern trains. The first batch, known as RTG, were built by the French firm ANF and entered service on multiple routes in the Midwestern United States in 1973. The new trains led to ridership increases wherever used, but the fixed consist proved a detriment as demand outstripped supply. The high cost of operating the trains led to their withdrawal from the Midwest in 1981.

The second batch, known as RTL, were of a similar design but manufactured by Rohr Industries. These entered service on the Empire Corridor in the state of New York in 1976. The RTLs remained in service there through the 1990s, supplemented by several rebuilt RTGs. In the late 1990s and early 2000s, New York and Amtrak partnered to rebuild the RTLs for high-speed service; this project failed, and the last RTL trainsets left revenue service in 2003, with all but three being scrapped. One RTG survives in a derelict state on a private property near Dugger, Indiana. 2 RTLs are currently stored at Adams Yard in the County Yard railyard complex in New Jersey, and 1 is held at Cedar Hill Yard in New Haven, Connecticut.

Background
Amtrak assumed control of almost all private sector intercity passenger rail service in the United States on May 1, 1971, with a mandate to reverse decades of decline. Amtrak retained approximately 184 of the 440 trains which had run the day before. To operate these trains, Amtrak inherited a fleet of 300 locomotives (electric and diesel) and 1,190 passenger cars, most of which dated from the 1940s–1950s.

Amtrak acquired the Turboliners with multiple goals in mind. The Turboliners were expected to cost less to operate than a comparable diesel locomotive with conventional cars while having a higher operating speed, though this would be constrained by track conditions. Amtrak also hoped that introducing new equipment would generate favorable publicity. Two years into its existence, Amtrak was fighting the perception that it was making "cosmetic changes to hand-me-down equipment". New gas turbine trainsets could change that perception.

The late 1960s and early 1970s saw several countries experimenting with gas turbine trains. The UAC TurboTrain had been in revenue service in the United States and Canada since 1968, with mixed results. British Rail began testing the APT-E in 1972; for a variety of reasons, British Rail did not pursue gas turbine propulsion.

RTG

Design
The RTG (abbreviated from the French Rame à Turbine à Gaz, or gas turbine train) model was an Americanized version of the French ANF T 2000 RTG Turbotrain (related to the prototype precursor to the very first TGV trainset, the TGV 001). The RTGs used European-style couplers (buffers and turnbuckles) between their cars, because they were built in France by ANF for SNCF. Another change was the installation of top-mounted Nathan P1234A5 horns, a variation of the standard Nathan P5. The RTGs met a lower standard set by the International Union of Railways.

Each trainset consisted of two power cars (which included seating), two coaches and a bar/grill. The trains were powered by a pair of  Turbomeca Turmo III turbines. The cars rode on Creusot-Loire trucks. The bar/grill, located at the center of the trainset, had table seating for 24. The vestibules between the cars were partitioned by sliding doors: one at each end of the car, and a double set between the cars themselves. A passenger moving between cars thus had to pull open three sets of doors. The trains were not intended for use with high-level platforms, and there were no traps covering the steps down to platform level. A five-car trainset could be configured with up to 44 coach seats in the end power cars, 80 coach seats in the middle coaches and to up 60 seats in the snack bar for a maximum of 308 passengers.

Between 1985 and 1988, three RTG trainsets (numbered 64 to 69) were rebuilt at the Beech Grove Shops for the Empire Corridor in New York. Each trainset received an RTL-style nose and third rail capability for operation into Grand Central Terminal. A new  Turbomeca engine replaced the original. The rebuilt units were designated RTG-II.

Service
Amtrak leased two RTG trainsets from ANF for 18 months in August 1973, at $85,000 per month with an option to purchase. These were based out of Chicago, and initially served the Chicago–St Louis corridor. Amtrak heralded the Turboliners as the "biggest travel news since the 747". David P. Morgan, editor-in-chief of Trains magazine, was aboard for the initial run from Chicago to St Louis on September 28, 1973 and came away with mixed impressions. He praised the large picture windows, comparing them favorably with the "rifle-slot-size" windows on the Budd Metroliner, but faulted the narrow aisles, difficult-to-navigate vestibules, and seat comfort. He found that the trains "[rode] reasonably well", even on rough track.

Advantages over conventional diesel equipment included increased availability, higher speed through curves, and decreased weight which caused less wear on the tracks. Impressed with their reliability, Amtrak purchased the trainsets outright and ordered another four trainsets, which entered service in 1975 on the Chicago–Milwaukee and Chicago–Detroit corridors. The purchase price for the six trainsets was $18 million. Amtrak contemplated ordering an additional 14 trainsets for the partially-electrified Northeast Corridor between Boston and New York City. Doing so would have required a significant rise in fares between the two cities, and the United States Department of Transportation blocked the proposal.

Amtrak established a separate maintenance facility for all six trainsets in the Brighton Park neighborhood of Chicago, on the site of a former Gulf, Mobile & Ohio Railroad coach yard. This facility closed in 1981 after the withdrawal of the RTGs from service; according to Amtrak, the trainsets were too expensive to operate compared to conventional equipment. The trainsets were mothballed at Amtrak's main maintenance facility in Beech Grove, Indiana. A contributing factor to the withdrawal was the spike in fuel prices after the Yom Kippur War.

The three rebuilt RTG-II trainsets joined the RTL trainsets on the Empire Corridor in 1988. Insufficient maintenance in the early 1990s reduced reliability and led to several fires in 1993–1994. Amtrak retired the RTG-IIs after one caught fire in Pennsylvania Station in New York on September 11, 1994.

St Louis
The two daily round-trips were branded Turboliner, replacing the individual names Abraham Lincoln and Prairie State. Amtrak repeated this experiment with the Detroit and Milwaukee corridors. In the first year, the Chicago–St. Louis running time dropped from 5.5 to 5 hours. The new trains had fallen out of favor by the end of 1974: food service was inadequate, and the five-car fixed consist could not handle demand. Amfleet coaches and new conventional diesels replaced both of the Turboliner trainsets in 1975.

Detroit
Turboliners arrived on the Detroit run on April 10, 1975. Additional equipment allowed Amtrak to add a round-trip in late April; the arrival of a third trainset in May made Chicago–Detroit the "first all-turbine-powered route". After one year of operation, ridership on the corridor had increased by 72 percent. The fixed capacity of 292 passengers on an RTL trainset proved an impediment; Amtrak could not add capacity when demand outstripped supply. Amtrak replaced one of the trainsets with a conventional locomotive hauling then-new Amfleet coaches in 1976; Turboliner service ended altogether by 1981 as more Amfleet equipment became available.

Milwaukee
Turboliners debuted on the Hiawatha corridor on June 1, 1975, and more trainsets began operating in 1976. As with the St. Louis and Detroit corridors, Amtrak dropped individual names in favor of the Turboliner branding in 1976, but reinstated these names in 1980. Turboliner equipment was withdrawn altogether in 1981. Their withdrawal was the end of Turboliner service in the Midwest.

RTL

Amtrak ordered another seven Turboliner trainsets, which were delivered between 1976 and 1977. These were manufactured by Rohr Industries in Chula Vista, California, and were known as RTL Turboliners. They were based on the earlier RTG series, but had American-style Janney couplers throughout and a different design of power car cab. The standard configuration of each set was five cars: power cars at either end, a food service car, and two coaches. In that configuration, each trainset could carry 264 passengers. At times, Amtrak operated Turboliners with an additional coach cut into the consist. These were the final gas turbine trainsets purchased by Amtrak; conventional diesel locomotive-hauled trains proved cheaper to operate.

The RTL Turboliners were wider than the RTG Turboliners ( versus ) to accommodate more seating. The floor height was raised for use on the high-level platforms of the Northeast Corridor.

The RTL Turboliners were capable of third rail operation, allowing them to enter Grand Central Terminal and, later, Pennsylvania Station in New York City. As it had with the earlier RTGs in the Midwest, Amtrak set up a separate maintenance facility in Rensselaer, New York. This facility opened on November 30, 1977, and cost $15 million. The seven trainsets cost $32 million.

The official inaugural run of the RTLs took place on September 18–19, 1976. Regular service on the Empire Corridor began on September 20. Initially, the two trainsets were mostly confined to the New York–Albany shuttle, with a single round-trip each on Saturday and Sunday to Buffalo. The New York–Montreal Adirondack received Turboliners on March 1, 1977, replacing conventional equipment. By April 1977, Turboliners had displaced conventional equipment on most routes in upstate New York. Exceptions included some New York–Albany trains, as well as the long-distance Lake Shore Limited and Niagara Rainbow. In 1989, after 12 years of operation, the availability of the fleet was at 90%.

RTL-II
In 1995, Amtrak and the State of New York collaborated to rebuild a single RTL trainset at a cost of $2 million. This rebuild included a pair of new Turbomeca Makila T1 turbines, each capable of developing . The interiors were to be renovated, and the exterior paint scheme changed. Morrison-Knudsen rebuilt the power cars, while Amtrak overhauled the coach interiors at Beech Grove. The rebuilt trainset was designated RTL-II.

RTL-III 

In 1998, Amtrak and the State of New York began the High Speed Rail Improvement Program, a $185 million effort to improve service over the Empire Corridor. A key component was the reconstruction of all seven RTL Turboliner trainsets to the RTL-III specification. New York selected Super Steel Schenectady to perform the work, and the first two trainsets were to enter service in 1999. Numerous delays pushed the start of service to April 2003. Of the five additional trainsets, originally scheduled to enter service in 2002, only one was completed and it never entered revenue service. All seven trainsets were renumbered in 2001 to prevent duplicate numbers with the new GE P42DCs and were painted in new Acela-style livery. One of the rebuilt RTL-IIIs was tested on the night of February 15, 2001, reaching .

The first rebuilt RTL-III entered service on April 14, 2003. The agreement between Amtrak and New York provided that New York would take ownership of the rebuilt trainsets once Amtrak had "fully accepted" them for regular revenue service. Amtrak withdrew all RTL-IIIs from service in June after problems developed with the air-conditioning systems. In 2004, New York sued Amtrak in federal court for $477 million, both for not operating the trainsets and for failing to complete track work in the Empire Corridor to permit regular  operation. Amtrak mothballed the equipment at its maintenance facility in Bear, Delaware. Joseph H. Boardman, then-Commissioner of the New York State Department of Transportation (and a future president of Amtrak), accused Amtrak of "stealing" the trains and threatened to find a new vendor for the state's intercity rail service. Conventional Amfleet equipment replaced the trainsets in revenue service.

In April 2005, New York reached a settlement with Super Steel to close the rehabilitation project for $5.5 million, requiring them to stop work on the project, cover remaining costs, and move four unfinished trains into storage at a nearby industrial park. This settlement, when added to the $64.8 million previously spent, brought total project expenses—the results of which were three rehabilitated trainsets and four others in various states of repair—to $70.3 million. In 2007, Amtrak and New York settled their own lawsuit, with Amtrak paying New York $20 million. Amtrak and New York further agreed to commit $10 million each to implement track improvements in the Empire Corridor. New York, which was paying $150,000 per year to store the unused trains, auctioned off its four surplus Turboliners in 2012 for $420,000, including spare parts; scrapping began in 2013. The three remaining RTL trainsets were stored in Bear, Delaware until 2018, but in January 2018, one set was moved to Cedar Hill Yard in New Haven, Connecticut and two sets were moved to Adams Yard in North Brunswick, New Jersey. The sets at Adams Yard remain in storage as of April 2021.

See also 

 Bombardier JetTrain
 Turbine-electric transmission

Notes

References

Further reading

External links 

 Turboliners on Amtrak's History site

High-speed trains of the United States
Amtrak rolling stock
B-2 locomotives
Gas turbine locomotives of the United States
Railway locomotives introduced in 1973
1973 establishments in the United States